Peyton Logan (born November 28, 1998) is a professional Canadian football running back and kick returner for the Calgary Stampeders of the Canadian Football League (CFL).

College career
Logan played college football for the UT Martin Skyhawks from 2017 to 2021. He played in 52 games where he had 2,513 rushing yards and 12 touchdowns as well as 86 receptions for 727 yards and four touchdowns.

Professional career
On May 4, 2022, it was announced that Logan had signed with the Calgary Stampeders. He began the 2022 season on the practice roster, but made his professional debut in Week 2 against the Hamilton Tiger-Cats on June 18, 2022, as a backup running back. In that game, he had nine carries for 45 yards, four receptions for 59 yards, and two kickoff returns for 40 yards. He scored his first career touchdown on July 7, 2022, against the Edmonton Elks when he returned a missed field goal 122 yards for a touchdown. In that same game, he had five carries for 45 yards and scored his first rushing touchdown while being named a CFL Top Performer for week 5.

Personal life
Logan was born to parents Patrick and Phyllis Logan and has one sibling, Patrice.

References

External links
 Calgary Stampeders bio

1998 births
Living people
American football running backs
Calgary Stampeders players
Canadian football running backs
UT Martin Skyhawks football players
Players of American football from Memphis, Tennessee